C.O.G. is an American comedy-drama film directed and written by Kyle Patrick Alvarez and starring Jonathan Groff. The film is based on a David Sedaris short story from his book of collected essays, Naked. It marks the first time one of Sedaris's stories was adapted for film. It co-stars Denis O'Hare, Casey Wilson, Dean Stockwell, Troian Bellisario, and Corey Stoll.

Plot
Based on David Sedaris' autobiographical short story, C.O.G. (which stands for Child of God) follows Samuel (Jonathan Groff), who attempts to immerse himself in "the real world," and go "off the grid" following his graduation from Yale to work at an apple farm under an alias. Out of his element and failing to fit in amongst the town's migrant workers and deeply religious locals, Samuel begins a journey that will take him deep into unfamiliar, awkward, and sometimes humorous territory as he encounters would-be benefactors and friends alike.

Cast
Jonathan Groff as David (who tells some people his name is Samuel), the character is loosely based on David Sedaris as a young man when he traveled to Oregon and took on the occupation of an apple picker.
Denis O'Hare as Jon, a deeply religious, recovering alcoholic who takes David (Samuel) under his wing making Oregon-shaped clocks 
Casey Wilson as Martha, a kind-hearted young mother and devoted Christian who allows David (Samuel) to stay in her home.
Dean Stockwell as Hobbs, an old farm owner who hires David (Samuel) and gets him a job in the factory.
Dale Dickey as Debbie, David's (Samuel's) foul-mouthed assembly line co-worker in the apple factory.
Troian Bellisario as Jennifer, David's (Samuel's) friend who unexpectedly bails on him early on.
Corey Stoll as Curly, the friendly forklift operator at the apple factory. Curly takes a flirtatious interest in David (Samuel) that turns darker as the film progresses.

Reception
The film received mostly positive reactions. Rotten Tomatoes gives the film a score of 69% based on reviews from 36 critics, and a rating average of 6.5 out of 10. The site's critical consensus reads, "C.O.G.'s plot is a bit meandering, but the characters are always compelling and the ending is richly rewarding." Reviews stated that director-screenwriter Kyle Patrick Alvarez adapted the David Sedaris story to film well, noting the performances of lead Groff, Stoll, O'Hare, Dickey, and particularly Wilson in a dramatic role.

Filming
C.O.G. was filmed on location in Forest Grove, Oregon in October 2012.

Release
The film premiered at the Sundance Film Festival on January 20, 2013, where its distribution rights were bought by Focus Features and it was nominated for the Grand Jury Prize in the festival's U.S. Dramatic Competition. It has since premiered at the Seattle International Film Festival, where it won the "Best New American Cinema" award. The film also opened the 2013 Outfest Film Festival on July 10, 2013.

The film was released on VOD and in theaters on September 20, 2013.

References

External links
 
 
 

2013 comedy-drama films
2013 films
American comedy-drama films
American LGBT-related films
American independent films
Films based on short fiction
Films directed by Kyle Patrick Alvarez
Films set in Portland, Oregon
Films shot in Oregon
Gay-related films
2013 independent films
LGBT-related black comedy films
LGBT-related comedy-drama films
Films critical of religion
2010s English-language films
2010s American films
English-language comedy-drama films